John Cason may refer to:
 John L. Cason, American actor
 John Cason (baseball), American Negro league baseball player